Cacia proteus is a species of beetle in the family Cerambycidae. It was described by Heller in 1915. It is known from Borneo and the Philippines.

References

Cacia (beetle)
Beetles described in 1915